The 1976 IMSA Formula Atlantic Players Championship Series season was contested over 6 rounds. In this one-make engine formula all drivers had to use Ford engines.

Calendar

Final points standings

Driver

For every race the points were awarded: 20 points to the winner, 15 for runner-up, ?

Formula Atlantic
Atlantic Championship seasons
Formula Atlantic